Mike Palefau is an American rugby union player who plays center in 7s and wing in 15s. Palefau currently plays for the Utah Warriors having moved mid season from the Seattle Seawolves.

Palefau has been playing rugby since he was 18 years old.  Palefau attended Southern Utah University and played rugby for the Collegiate All-American Team. Palefau excelled in other sports at Kahuku High School and at Southern Utah University, playing defensive back in football, and as a sprinter on the track team. Palefau finished second in the 2000 Hawaii High School Championships in the 100 meter and 4x100 meter sprints.

International career
Palefau played for the US national 7s team. He was the team's leading try scorer and points scorer for the 2011-12 IRB Sevens World Series.  Palefau debuted for the national 7s team in 2005, playing in the 2005 Rugby World Cup Sevens.  Since 2005, Palefau was a steady scorer for the US. At the time of his retirement from the 7s national team, he ranked as one of the top active try-scorers for the US 7s team with over 20 tries on the IRB Sevens World Series.

Palefau was "discovered" in the summer of 2004 while playing with the Provo Steeler rugby team in a sevens competition in Park City, Utah, when US National team scouts noticed Palefau's athleticism and quickness. Palefau debuted for the Eagles 15s national team in 2005 against Canada.  Since then, he has totaled 11 caps playing wing for the 15s national team.

Palefau took a break from international rugby between 2009–11, focusing on family life and on finishing his Master's degree at the Southern Utah University.

Club rugby
Palefau has played professional club rugby oversees with Narbonne in France (2006–07) and with Petrarca in Italy (2007–08), before returning to the US to finish his degree at Southern Utah University.

Palefau helped lead Las Vegas to a national D1 club championship in 2010. Palefau currently plays for OPSB club in the Rugby Super League (US).

Palefau signed with the Seattle Seawolves in 2017, for the upcoming 2018 Major League Rugby season.

See also
 United States national rugby sevens team

References

1981 births
Living people
American rugby union players
United States international rugby sevens players
United States international rugby union players